The Very Best of the Doors is the ninth compilation album by the rock band the Doors. It was released on September 25, 2007, to commemorate the band's 40th anniversary. The masters were drawn from the same remixes/remasters used for the 2006 Perception box set and 2007 Doors reissues.

Three versions of the album were releaseda single CD version (UK only) and two double-CD versions with minor differences (US and UK).

Critical reception

Music writer Stephen Thomas Erlewine gave The Very Best of the Doors four and a half out of five stars in an album review for AllMusic. He outlines the differences between the similarly named releases and advises "if you're looking for an introduction or just the hits, take either of the 2001 or 2007 single discs; if you're looking for most of the best, pick the double-disc set, either with or without the DVDs."

Track listings
All tracks are written by the Doors (John Densmore, Robby Krieger, Ray Manzarek, Jim Morrison), except where noted. Details are taken from the 2007 Elektra/Rhino double CD liner notes, except running times, which are taken from the AllMusic review. Other releases may show different information.

Single CD version
Released in the US as The Future Starts Here: The Essential Doors Hits (2008).

Double CD version

Bonus DVD
Walmart-exclusive double CD plus DVD set contains the UK track listing (even if bought in the U.S.). The DVD highlights performances from Live in Europe 1968.

Personnel
Jim Morrison – vocals
Robby Krieger – guitar
Ray Manzarek – piano, organ
John Densmore – drums

Certifications

References

2007 greatest hits albums
Albums produced by Paul A. Rothchild
Albums produced by Bruce Botnick
Elektra Records compilation albums
Rhino Records compilation albums
The Doors compilation albums